Chanel Contos is an Australian student and sexual consent activist. Contos became known globally in 2021, following an outpouring of responses to her request for young Australian women to report on their sexual assault experiences.

Early life and education
Contos grew up first in Glenorie then moved to Vaucluse, an affluent suburb near Sydney. She graduated from the Kambala School in Sydney. She then studied at the University of New South Wales for a Bachelor's degree in Commerce/Arts, Information Systems and Development Studies. In 2020 she began a master's degree in gender and education at University College London.

Activism
In February 2021, Contos began an Instagram poll asking for stories from young Australian women who had been sexually assaulted. After an outpouring of responses, she started the website Teach Us Consent, which hosted a separate online petition to ask for sexual consent education in Australian schools. The petition generated a strong response, with over 44,000 signatures within a month of its launch, along with over 5,000 stories of sexual assault.

In March 2021, the sex crimes unit of the New South Wales Police Force collaborated with Contos to ask young women who had filed stories of assault on Contos' site to also make informal reports to the NSW police department. In April 2021 Contos proposed that an anonymous online tip site be set up to enable young victims of sexual assault to report assaults to the Australian police. In May 2021 Australian Prime Minister Scott Morrison pledged to meet with Contos to discuss sexual consent education.

Recognition
In the 2021 Australian Human Rights Awards, Chanel won the Young People's Human Rights Medal.  She was honoured as one of BBC's 100 Women in 2022.

References

External links
teachusconsent.com

Living people
Australian women activists
Date of birth missing (living people)
University of New South Wales alumni
Year of birth missing (living people)
BBC 100 Women